Selaginella substipitata, the stalked spikemoss, is a species of plant in the Selaginellaceae family, endemic to Caribbean islands, Colombia, and Venezuela.

Synonyms
 Selaginella karsteniana A. Braun
 Selaginella rigidula Baker

References

 Bull. Acad. Roy. Sci. Bruxelles 10(1): 227 1843.
 The Plant List
 GBIF
 

substipitata